The Abominable Snow Rabbit is a 1961 Warner Bros. Looney Tunes theatrical cartoon directed by Chuck Jones and co-directed by Maurice Noble, with a story by Tedd Pierce. The short was released on May 20, 1961, and stars Bugs Bunny and Daffy Duck. The cartoon's title is taken from the phrase and horror film The Abominable Snowman. It was the final original Chuck Jones theatrical cartoon with Daffy Duck.

Plot 
Bugs tunnels through the Himalayan mountains, followed by Daffy. After a failed attempt by Daffy to go swimming in a frozen pond, the two realize that they are not at their intended destination, Palm Springs (once again, having made a wrong turn at Albuquerque). Daffy tells Bugs that he's going back to Perth Amboy and leaves.

Daffy, while underground, crashes into a creature's foot. The Abominable Snowman (whose name is Hugo, but that is not revealed in this short) grabs Daffy, names him George (a reference to Of Mice and Men, casting Hugo as Lennie Small to Daffy's George Milton), and gives him crippling hugs, believing Daffy is a rabbit, when actually Daffy just tied his swim shirt round his head for warmth, with the sleeves on top. Daffy reveals this by angrily yelling loudly ("I AIN'T NO BUNNY RABBIT!") and showing Hugo the "ears" are in fact sleeves, and Hugo proceeds to spank Daffy for "pretending he was a bunny rabbit". However, Daffy imparts to him where he can find a real rabbit, in this case Bugs. As Bugs starts experiencing Hugo's overbearing love, Daffy sneaks away. Hugo sits on Bugs, who sneaks out under the snow, carrying a monologuing Daffy towards Hugo.

As Hugo doubts that Daffy is or is not a rabbit, Daffy asks what a rabbit's distinguishing characteristics are. Hugo responds that rabbits have long ears, making Bugs tie down his own ears and stick two of his fingers behind Daffy's head as rabbit ears. After Hugo painfully hugs the duck again but realizes that he has a bill and feathers, a crippled Daffy points out the tunneling Bugs to Hugo, who chases him underground. Eager to see the incident's conclusion, Daffy follows.

Later, in Palm Springs, a profusely sweating Hugo, and a disguised Bugs, discuss Hugo's failure to catch Bugs. Hugo believes that he will not be able to see the rabbit again, but Bugs encourages him by telling him "if he loves you, he'll come back". When Daffy emerges from the hole, Bugs puts fake rabbit ears on him, causing Hugo to recognize him as a rabbit again. While Daffy is cuddled for the last time, Hugo literally melts due to the intense heat of the environment. Bugs comments, "He really was a snowman!" and Daffy, soaked in water, replies, "Abominable, that is."

Crew
Co-Director & Layouts: Maurice Noble
Story: Tedd Pierce
Animation: Ken Harris, Richard Thompson, Bob Bransford & Tom Ray
Backgrounds: Philip DeGuard
Film Editor: Treg Brown
Voice Characterizations: Mel Blanc
Music: Milt Franklyn
Produced by John W. Burton & David H. DePatie
Directed by Chuck Jones

Voice cast
 Mel Blanc as Bugs Bunny, Daffy Duck, and Hugo

Home media
The Abominable Snow Rabbit is included on the DVD collection Looney Tunes Golden Collection: Volume 5 as well as the VHS collections Looney Tunes After Dark, Bugs Bunny: Big Top Bunny and To Grandmother's House We Go. Most of the footage was also used in the compilation movie, Daffy Duck's Quackbusters except for one part when Bugs and Daffy traveled to the Himalayas.

See also 
 List of American films of 1961
 List of Bugs Bunny cartoons
 List of Daffy Duck cartoons

References

External links 

 

1961 films
1961 animated films
1961 short films
Short films directed by Chuck Jones
Bugs Bunny films
Daffy Duck films
Films set in the Himalayas
Films set in California
Looney Tunes shorts
Warner Bros. Cartoons animated short films
Films scored by Milt Franklyn
Films directed by Maurice Noble
1960s Warner Bros. animated short films
1960s English-language films
Films about Yeti